is a Japanese football player. He plays for Japanese club Yokohama F. Marinos and the Japan national team.

Club career
On 31 August 2018, he signed a 4-year contract with the Russian Premier League club CSKA Moscow.

He scored his first Russian Premier League goal for CSKA on 9 March 2019 in a 3–0 victory over FC Rubin Kazan.

On 10 January 2020 CSKA announced that he would join Portuguese club Portimonense on loan for the rest of the 2019–20 season, with a purchase option. On 26 March, Nishimura's loan deal at Portimonense was ended, prematurely, to allow Nishimura to return to Vegalta Sendai on loan until June 2020.

On 11 February 2021, Vegalta Sendai announced that he would return to the club on a permanent transfer.

In 2022, he moved to Yokohama F. Marinos and scored a goal to win the team in the league title.

On 11 February 2023, he scored the winning goal at the Japanese Super Cup, giving Marinos their first Super Cup title.

Career statistics

Club

International goals
Scores and results list Japan's goal tally first.

Honours

Club
Yokohama F. Marinos
 J1 League: 2022
Japanese Super Cup: 2023

References

External links
Profile at Vegalta Sendai

1996 births
Living people
Association football people from Aichi Prefecture
Japanese footballers
J1 League players
J3 League players
Vegalta Sendai players
J.League U-22 Selection players
Association football forwards
PFC CSKA Moscow players
Portimonense S.C. players
Yokohama F. Marinos players
Russian Premier League players
Japanese expatriate footballers
Expatriate footballers in Russia
Japanese expatriate sportspeople in Russia
Expatriate footballers in Portugal
Primeira Liga players